VIC is a Toggle Original drama series. It was originally released on Toggle on Thursdays, and later aired on Mediacorp Channel U on Sundays. The show depicts the media and modelling industry, and contains some supernatural elements. It was the first Toggle Original Series to be nominated for Best Drama Serial, Best Theme Song and Best Actress for Star Awards. It stars model-actress Sheila Sim, Carrie Wong, Desmond Tan, Irene Ang, Steven Chiang, Jasmine Sim and Cheryl Chou as the main cast. The cast also includes real-life models and past contestants of Miss Universe Singapore.

Synopsis
Vicky takes part in a reality show Fresh Off The Runway, hoping to become a top model. The executive producer of the show, Cao Shi Ren hopes to create buzz in the media, and resorts to sending anonymous death threats to one of the contestants who happens to be Vicky. One thing leads to another, until one day she is accidentally electrocuted. The CEO of Victory Property, Victoria Lek happens to be visiting the set, gets entangled in the accident and ends up in Vicky’s body while her own is missing. She has no choice but to continue in Vicky’s body as a contestant in the reality show.

Cast

Main Cast

Fresh Off The Runway

Victory Property

Other Characters

Episodes

Trivia 
Cheryl Chou, Shi Lim, Valnice Yek, Vanessa Peh, Joeypink Lai, Ling Ying and Sharlin Dian’s debut series.
Carrie Wong’s second dual role after Against the Tide.

Awards & Nominations
VIC was nominated for 4 categories in Star Awards 2019.

Star Awards 2019

See also
List of programmes broadcast by Mediacorp Channel 8

References

Chinese television series
2018 Chinese television series debuts